Eric Lucey (10 March 1923 – 26 August 2010) was a British scientific film pioneer, best known for his film showing a flea's jump.

Early life 
Lucey was born in Broadheath, Worcestershire. His father was a clergyman and as a teenager, he attended a small boarding school for the sons of clergy near Cheltenham. He was encouraged to conduct his own experiments at the school's physics and chemistry laboratories. He had an interest in craftwork and photography, skills he utilised when he was in charge of the West African Photographic Liaison Service, while on war service in India. He spent a year in Cornwall after being demobilised, before heading to Edinburgh to study science.

Education 
Lucey studied science at the University of Edinburgh. During his studies he was involved in student politics, charities and other social activities. He assisted in organising the first torchlight procession from Edinburgh Castle to Calton Hill where he met Elspeth, his future wife.

Career 
In the 1950s, after graduating from the University, he met Conrad Hal Waddington, director of the Institute of Animal Genetics and was offered the opportunity to initiate a Research Film Unit at the institute. One of the key characteristics of Lucey's work was his manipulation of speed, motion and scale using various techniques, most notably, time-lapse and microphotography.

Notable works 

Jump of the Flea
Time Lapse of Sky, Flowers, Princes Street and Lothian Road
Mimosa Pudica unfurling
Shoreline Sediments (won first prize in the Geography/Geology section at the 5th International Festival of Science and Technical Films in 1970)

Death 
Lucey died in Edinburgh on 26 August 2010.

References 

1923 births
2010 deaths
People from Malvern Hills District
Scientists from Worcestershire